Mei-Chu Chang is a mathematician who works in algebraic geometry and combinatorial number theory.

Education 
Chang did her undergraduate studies in Taiwan and received a BS from National Taiwan University.  She did her doctoral work at University of California, Berkeley, under the supervision of Robin Hartshorne and was awarded her PhD in 1982. Her dissertation was on Some Results on Stable Rank 2 Vector Bundles and Reflexive Sheaves on P3.

Career and research
After finishing her doctoral studies, Dr. Chang was appointed a Bateman Research Instructor at the California Institute of Technology.  She held assistant professor positions at the University of Michigan and University of South Carolina before accepting a position as an associate professor at the University of California, Riverside in 1987.  She was promoted to professor at Riverside in 1991.  Prof. Chang has held visiting positions in Sweden, Korea, and Italy, at the IHES in Paris, and the IAS in Princeton, as well at several institutions in the US.

In her most cited work, A polynomial bound in Freiman's theorem, Professor Chang established new quantitative bounds for Freiman's inverse theorem.

Honors
Mei-Chu Chang was elected a Fellow of the American Mathematical Society in 2017. The citation reads "For contributions to arithmetic combinatorics, analytic number theory, and algebraic geometry."  In 2009 she was chosen to give a plenary address at the 9th International Conference on Finite Fields and Applications, which was held in Dublin, Ireland.

References

External links 
 Mei-Chu Chang's  Author Profile Page on MathSciNet
 Mei-Chu Chang's  Website at University of California, Riverside

20th-century American mathematicians
21st-century American mathematicians
University of California, Berkeley alumni
University of California, Riverside faculty
Fellows of the American Mathematical Society
Algebraic geometers
American women mathematicians
Living people
Year of birth missing (living people)
20th-century women mathematicians
21st-century women mathematicians
University of Michigan faculty
20th-century American women
21st-century American women